The Alberta Group is a stratigraphical unit of Cenomanian to early Campanian age in the Lewis overthrust in the Western Canadian Sedimentary Basin.

It takes the name from the province of Alberta, and was first described in outcrops along the Highwood River in southern Alberta by G.S. Hume in 1930.

Lithology
The Alberta Group is composed of silty shale for the most part. Two thick shale deposits (Blackstone Formation and Wapiabi Formation) are present above and below a sandstone sequence (the Cardium Formation). Sideritic concretions and thin argillaceous limestone beds are present within the shale stacks.

Oil/gas production
Gas is produced from the Cardium Formation in Yellowhead County.

Distribution
The Alberta Group occurs along the Canadian Rockies foothills from the United States-Canada border to the Athabasca River.

Relationship to other units

The Alberta Group is conformably overlain by the Belly River Formation and rests unconformably on deposits of the Blairmore Group and Luscar Group in the Canadian Rockies foothills and on the volcanic Crowsnest Formation in southern Alberta's west. The group is equivalent with the Colorado Group and Lea Park Formation in southern Alberta's prairies, and with the Smoky Group in northern Alberta and north-east British Columbia.

The Wapiabi Formation is equivalent to the upper Colorado Group shales and Lea Park Formation in central Alberta and the sum of Puskwaskau Formation, Bad Heart Formation and Muskiki Formation in the west part of northern Alberta.

Subdivisions
The Alberta Group has the following sub-divisions from top to base:

References

Stratigraphy of Alberta
Cretaceous System of North America